Below is a list of notable men's and women's artistic gymnastics international events held in 2021, as well as the medalists.

Retirements

Calendar of events

Canceled events
Due to the COVID-19 pandemic, several events were canceled.

Medalists

Women

International events

Regional championships

World Cup series

Men

International events

Regional championships

World Cup series

Season's best scores

Women 
Note: Only the scores of senior gymnasts from international events have been included below.  Only one score per gymnast is included.

All-around

Vault

Uneven bars

Balance beam

Floor exercise

Men

All around

Floor exercise

Pommel horse

Rings

Single vault

Vault

Parallel bars

Horizontal bar

References

Artistic
Artistic gymnastics
Gymnastics by year
2021 sport-related lists